Palnadu district is a district in coastal Andhra Region in the Indian state of Andhra Pradesh. With Narasaraopet as its administrative headquarters, it was formed on 4 April 2022 to become one of the resultant twenty-six districts The district was formed from Gurazala, Sattenapalli and Narasaraopet revenue divisions from Guntur district. The district covers most of the Palnadu region.

Boundaries
This district is bounded by Suryapet district and Nalgonda district in Telangana state at North. And surrounded by South of Bapatla district, West of Prakasam district And East of Guntur district.

Land Utilization
The total Geographical area of the District is 7,30,123 Hectares covered by forest is 1,50,759 Hectares. The net area sown is 3,15,650 Hectares. The total cropped area in the District is 3,47,114 Hectares. The area sown more than once during the year is 31,464 Hectares.

Natural and Mineral Resources
The district is rich in mineral resources. The principal minerals available are limestone,  lime Lime Stonekankar, Napa slabs, Copper and Lead. Lime stone is being utilised by the cement factories of Macherla. There are copper mines at Agnigundala of Ipur Mandal.

Climate
The Normal Rainfall of the District is 775.3 M.M. The climate is Generally warm in Summer and the heat is very severe in Rentachintala Mandal, where the maximum temperature in the State is recorded.

Demographics 

At the time of the 2011 census, the district had a population of 20,41,723, of which 458,551 (22.46%) lived in urban areas. Palnadu district has a sex ratio of 994 females per 1000 males. Scheduled Castes and Scheduled Tribes made up 3,75,554 (18.39%) and 1,42,944 (7.00%) of the population respectively.

At the time of the 2011 census, 87.12% of the population spoke Telugu, 9.90% Urdu and 2.41% Lambadi as their first language.

Administrative divisions 

The district has three revenue divisions, namely Gurajala, Sattenapalle and Narasaraopeta, each headed by a sub collector. These revenue divisions are divided into 28 mandals. The district consists of one municipal corporation. Narasaraopeta city is the only municipal corporation.

Politics 

There are one parliamentary and seven assembly constituencies in Palnadu district. The parliamentary constituencies are 
The assembly constituencies are

Mandals 

There are 9 mandals in Gurazala division, 9 mandals in Sattenapalle division and 10 mandals in Narasaraopeta division. The 28 mandals under their revenue divisions are listed below:

Cities and towns 

Note -

 Dachepalli Nagar Panchayat includes Dachepalli and Nadikudi.
 Gurazala Nagar Panchayat includes Gurazala and Jangamaheswaram.

Notable people 
 Kasu Brahmananda Reddy, former Chief Minister, Central Home Minister and Governor
 Vavilala Gopalakrishnayya,  journalist and he was elected to the assembly
 Palanati Brahmanaidu,  Palnadu Kingdom
 Nayakuralu Nagamma,  Palnadu Kingdom
 Kaneganti Hanumanthu,  freedom fighter
Gurram Jashuva, poet

References 

Districts of Andhra Pradesh
2022 establishments in Andhra Pradesh